October Ferry to Gabriola is a novel by Malcolm Lowry. Edited by his widow Margerie Bonner, it was posthumously published in 1970.

It is an existential love story featuring a Lowry-like character, Ethan Llewelyn, and his wife, in their never-fully-consummated journey to Gabriola, one of the Gulf Islands off the east coast of Vancouver Island in British Columbia. The themes are living, loving, drinking, travel, mysticism, and literature in the 1940s.

Details

External links
 Corrigan, Matthew. Lowry's Last Novel,  A Review from Canadian Literature vol. 48, 1971. p.74-80
 Foxcroft, Nigel H. The Kaleidoscopic Vision of Malcolm Lowry: Souls and Shamans (Lexington Books: Lanham, MD, 2019). . 
 A Review from Time Magazine November 1970

1970 British novels
English novels
Novels published posthumously
Novels set in British Columbia
Fiction set in the 1940s
Novels set on islands
World Publishing Company books